Awards and decorations of the Ukrainian Armed Forces are military decorations issued by the Ministry of Defence of Ukraine to soldiers who achieve a variety of qualifications, who have completed classroom training standards stipulated in their military occupational specialty and accomplishments while serving on active and reserve duty in the Armed Forces of Ukraine. Together with military badges, medals are a means to outwardly display the highlights of a service member's career.
These badges are worn in order of precedence (Master the highest). Only badge of the highest degree worn.

On May 30, 2012 President of Ukraine Viktor Yanukovych issued a decree enacted new regulations on departmental awards. During 2012-2013 the Ministry of Defence of Ukraine has developed a new system of incentive awards.

History

Badges for military service

Compulsory  military service

Army

Air Forces

Navy

Voluntary military service

Army

Air Forces

Navy

Ministry of Defence

Long Service Medal

Honorary badges of commanders of the Armed Forces

Chief of the General Staff and Commander of the Armed Forces Awards

Other Accoutrements
Excellence Badge is awarded to soldiers, sergeants and officers with excellent military discipline, with rewards for exemplary performance of duty, perfectly captured their field. provide excellent care, preservation and operation of weapons, military equipment and supplies; who can well organize and methodically correct conduct training subordinates, achieved high performance in combat and humanitarian training and strengthening military discipline of their units.

See also
 Awards and decorations of the Ukrainian Armed Forces (before 2012)

References

Decree of the President of Ukraine № 365/2012
Decree of the President of Ukraine № 1094/96
Decree of the President of Ukraine № 134/97
Decree of the President of Ukraine № 650/2004 № 650/2004

Ukrainian military-related lists